Malcolm Noel Waller (born 28 September 1984) is a Zimbabwean professional cricketer, who plays all formats of the game. He is a middle-order batsman and off-spinner. In December 2014, he was suspended from bowling by the International Cricket Council (ICC) due to his deliveries exceeding the permitted tolerance. 

In August 2015 his action was found to be legal and the next month he was selected in Zimbabwe's squad for their series against Pakistan.

International career 
Following his first-class debut in the Logan Cup in April 2008, he was called up to the national team for a tour of Bangladesh, where he made his international debut in a One Day International on 19 January 2009. Chasing mere 128, Zimbabwe were in trouble at 44/6 when Waller walked in and drove his first ball through the covers for four. He played a few more encouraging shots and was the top scorer in the innings with 24. With Ray Price's entertaining shots in the end Zimbabwe won by 2 wickets eventually.

Waller rose to fame when he helped Zimbabwe to chase down their highest ever target in One Day International of 328 against New Zealand at Bulawayo in the third ODI. He showed immense character to chase a total of more than 300 for the first time in Zimbabwe's history by remaining unbeaten on 99.

Test Debut against New Zealand, 2011
Following this, he made his Test debut against New Zealand in the only Test at Bulawayo on 1 November 2011. Waller remained unbeaten on 72 and became the eleventh Zimbabwean to score 50 or above in his debut test.

Retirement
Waller retired from International cricket on 19 March 2019.

Family
Waller's father, Andy, played for Zimbabwe in the 1980s and 1990s. His father also scored 50 in his debut Test albeit in the second innings. His cousin, Nathan Waller also represented Zimbabwe under-19 teams.

Education
Waller attended Lilfordia School. He then moved to the UK to study at Brighton College, where he played in the first XI for three years.

References

External links
 

1984 births
Living people
Cricketers from Harare
Mashonaland cricketers
Midlands cricketers
Zimbabwe Test cricketers
Zimbabwe One Day International cricketers
Zimbabwe Twenty20 International cricketers
Zimbabwean cricketers
Centrals cricketers
Mid West Rhinos cricketers
Dhaka Dominators cricketers
Zimbabwe Select XI cricketers
White Zimbabwean sportspeople
Balkh Legends cricketers
Ferguslie CC players